A Crimson Cosmos is the third studio album by the Swedish gothic metal band Lake of Tears. It was released in 1997. Its melodic sound with psychedelic influences reappeared in most of the band's later releases. The song "Lady Rosenred" was released as a single, also in 1997, with "Devil's Diner" and "A Crimson Cosmos" as B-sides. A video for "Devil's Diner" appeared on the Black Mark DVD Metal by Metal, released in 2003.

Critical reception 

In 2005, A Crimson Cosmos was ranked number 347 in Rock Hard magazine's book The 500 Greatest Rock & Metal Albums of All Time.

Track listing 
All songs written by Daniel Brennare.

Personnel 
 Daniel Brennare – vocals, guitar
 Mikael Larsson – bass
 Johan Oudhuis – drums

Additional personnel 
Jennie Tebler – vocals
Magnus Sahlgren – guitars on tracks 1, 5–7, 9
Ronny Lahti – keyboards, guitars, producer, engineering
Pelle Hogbring – keyboards
Kristian Wåhlin – cover art, layout
Stig Börje Forsberg – producer
Peter in de Betou – mastering
M. Kumpe – executive design, typography

References 

1997 albums
Lake of Tears albums